The 9th Asian Film Awards are the 2015 edition of the Asian Film Awards. The ceremony was held at the Venetian Theatre in The Venetian Casino and Hotel in Macau.

South Korean director Im Kwon-taek received the Lifetime Achievement Award, while Japanese actress Miki Nakatani received the Excellence in Asian Cinema Award.

This year marked the second time that the awards were organized by the Hong Kong International Film Festival, joined by the Busan and Tokyo film festivals through the Asian Film Awards (AFA) Academy.

Awards jury
The jury for the 9th Asian Film Awards are:
 Mabel Cheung (Hong Kong, film producer and director and president of the jury)
 Aaron Kwok (Hong Kong, actor and singer)
 Ronald Arguelles (Philippines, head of Cinema One premium cable channel) 
 John Badalu (Indonesia, festival delegate for Berlin and Shanghai International Film Festival)
 Alberto Barbera (Italy, director of National Museum of Cinema and Venice Film Festival)
 Tetsuya Bessho (Japan, actor and founder of Short Shorts Film Festival & Asia)
 Jeane Huang (Taiwan, director of the Taipei Film Festival)
 Huh Moonyung (South Korea, film critic for Cine 21)
 Kenji Ishizaka (Japan, programming director of the Tokyo International Film Festival)
 Christian Jeune (France, director of the film department of the Cannes Film Festival)
 Kim Ji-seok (South Korea, executive programmer of Busan International Film Festival) 
 Li Cheuk-To (Hong Kong, artistic director of the Hong Kong International Film Festival)
 Li Shaohong (China, film director and chairwoman of China Film Directors' Guild)
 Clarence Tsui (Hong Kong, film critic for The Hollywood Reporter)

Winners and nominees
Winners are listed first and highlighted in bold.

References

External links

Asian Film Awards ceremonies
2015 film awards
2015 in Macau
Film
Hong Kong